Charizma is a Swedish rock band formed in Oskarshamn, Sweden. It was founded in 1981 by the three brothers Bo, Jan  and Göran Nikolausson. In 1996 the band added two members, Johan Mauritzson and Thomas Karlsson. In November 2008 the band went on an indefinite hiatus.

Starting out as a hard rock trio in the early 1980s, at the end of the 1990s Charizma turned into a radio-friendly rock band focusing on melodies and strong vocal elements.

The band is primarily known for its songs "Waiting (Here for you)" and "Run to God". The song "Join hands" (1990) was a major hit in Estonia and became part of the Singing Revolution.

Charizma performed in the pre-selections for Eurovision Song Contest in 2004 in Estonia (Eurolaul) and in 2007 in Poland (Piosenka dla Europy 2007).

Charizma has toured all over the world including USA, UK, Germany, Australia, Switzerland, Austria, Liechtenstein, Estonia, Poland, Sweden, Finland, Norway, Denmark, The Netherlands and Faroe Islands.

Members
 Bo Nikolausson - bass guitar, backing vocals (1981–present)
 Jan Nikolausson - drums, percussion (1981–present)
 Göran Nikolausson - guitars, backing vocals (1981–present)
 Johan Mauritzson - lead vocals, Keyboards (1996–present)
 Thomas (TK) Karlsson - rhythm guitar, backing vocals (1996–present)

Until 1994, lead vocals were performed by Bo Nikolausson. Between 1991 and 1994, Johan Mauritzson played keyboards with the band, but was not an official member.

Discography

Albums

Singles

Chart positions
 "Waiting (Here for you)" reached no. 3 on the Swedish Top40 best selling chart on September 13, 2003. It spent 8 weeks on the list. The song also peaked at no. 62 on the Europe Official Top 100 on September 27, 2003 
"Where do you go?" reached no. 13 on the Swedish Top40 best selling chart on January 17, 2004.
"I give you a mountain" reached no. 41 on the Swedish best selling chart on May 21, 2004.

Videography
 "Emily"- shot January 2007, Oskarshamn Sweden. Directed and edited by Morgan Karlsson. Song entered in the Polish qualifications for Eurovision Song Contest.
 "Turn me on" - shot in 1989, Los Angeles. Directorial debut for Jay Torres, who later worked with Madonna and Aerosmith and directed  the TV shows Alias and Desperate Housewives.

References

External links
 The official Charizma website
 PAMA Records
 Talking Music
 Asaph Musik
 CMcentral Article about the album Life is precious, a tribute to Wes King
 "Emily" video on YouTube

Musical groups established in 1981
Swedish rock music groups
Christian rock groups